Changanassery State assembly constituency is one of the 140 state legislative assembly constituencies at the state Kerala in southern India. It is also one of the 7 state legislative assembly constituencies included in the Mavelikara Lok Sabha constituency.   C. F. Thomas represented the constituency for 40 consecutive years from 1980. In the 2021 Kerala legislative elections, Adv. Job Michael of the Kerala Congress (M) was elected from the constituency.

Local self governed segments
Changanassery Niyama Sabha constituency is composed of the following local self governed segments:

Members of Legislative Assembly 
The following list contains all members of Kerala Legislative Assembly who have represented the constituency:

Key

Election results 
Percentage change (±%) denotes the change in the number of votes from the immediately previous election.

Niyamasabha Election 2021 
C. F. Thomas who had represented the constituency for 40 years died in September 2020. Because of the pandemic and also the nearby legislative assembly elections, by- elections were not held. The Kerala Congress (M) had left the UDF and had joined the LDF. The Kerala Congress (Joseph) tied up with the Kerala Congress led by PC Thomas and contested the elections as Kerala Congress for the UDF. Kerala Congress lost in 8 out of 10 seats they contested including Changanassery. The incumbent seat holding Kerala Congress (M) won the seat. A thing to note here is that CF Thomas supported the Kerala Congress led by PJ Joseph following the fights which erupted within the party between Jose K Mani and P. J. Joseph over the leadership of the party following KM Mani's death.

Niyamasabha Election 2016 
There were 1,67,180 registered voters in the constituency for the 2016 Kerala Niyamasabha Election.

Niyamasabha Election 2011 
There were 1,49,193 registered voters in the constituency for the 2011 election.

See also
 Changanassery
 Kottayam district
 List of constituencies of the Kerala Legislative Assembly
 2016 Kerala Legislative Assembly election

References 

Assembly constituencies of Kerala

State assembly constituencies in Kottayam district